Ben or Benjamin Gunn may refer to:

 Ben Gunn (Treasure Island), fictional character in Robert Louis Stevenson's Treasure Island
 Ben Gunn (guitarist), early guitarist with The Sisters of Mercy
 Ben Gunn (campaigner) (born 1965), former prisoner on life licence
 Benn Gunn, Australian country performer
 Benjamin B. Gunn (1860–1907), Canadian politician

See also
 The Adventures of Ben Gunn, a 1956 novel by R. F. Delderfield, written as a prequel to the novel Treasure Island